This is a list of genera in the soapberry family, Sapindaceae, which includes the soapberries (Sapindus), maples (Acer), and paullinias, amongst others. As currently circumscribed, the family contains approximatively 1900 species into over 140 genera classified into 4 subfamilies.

Phylogeny and circumscription 
The circumscription of Sapindaceae encompasses the former Aceraceae and Hippocastanaceae families as tribes in subfamily Hippocastanoideae. Although the classification at subfamilial level is fairly well-established, the circumscription at tribal and generic level remains only partially resolved, especially in the larger subfamily Sapindoideae, which has led the most recent revision to treat the majority of these genera without placing them in a tribe. Another recent study hints at even more incongruity between traditional circumscription and molecular evidence.

Changes have included the synonymization of Distichostemon with Dodonaea, and Neotina and Tinopsis with Tina. Additionally, not all authors agree about the broad circumscription that ensues from placing Xanthoceras as the sister group to the three traditional families as the resulting Sapindaceae sensu lato, unlike the traditional families, is difficult to characterize. As a result, the elevation of Xanthoceroideae to family level was proposed, which would have removed six genera from Sapindaceae and Hippocastanoideae.

This list follows Acevedo-Rodríguez et al. as modified by more recent research.

Subfamily Dodonaeoideae

 Arfeuillea Radlkofer (1 Species; Thailand and Laos)
 Averrhoidium Baill. (4 Species;  Mexico, Tropical South America)
 Cossinia  (3; Mauritius, New Caledonia)
 Diplokeleba  (2 species; South America)
 Diplopeltis  (5 species; Australia)
 Distichostemon 
 Dodonaea  (60+ species; Pantropical)
 Doratoxylon   (6 species; Mauritius, Madagascar)
 Euchorium  (1 species; Cuba)
 Euphorianthus  (1; Eastern Malesia)
 Eurycorymbus  (1 species; China)
 Exothea  (3; West Indies, Central America)
 Filicium  (3-4; Madagascar, East Africa to India, Sri Lanka)
 Ganophyllum  (1-2; Paleotropics)
 Harpullia  (26; India and China to Australasia) 
 Hippobromus  (1; Africa)
 Hypelate  (1; West Indies, Florida)
 Llagunoa  (3-4;  Andes)
 Loxodiscus  (1; New Caledonia)
 Magonia  (1; Brazil, Bolivia, Paraguay)
 Majidea  (4-5; Africa and Madagascar)
 †Wehrwolfea  (1; Ypresian, Princeton Chert)
 Zanha  (23; Southern Africa, Madagascar)

Hippocastanoideae

Acereae
 Acer  (120+; Northern hemisphere)
 Dipteronia  (2; China)

Hippocastaneae
 Aesculus  (13; Temperate Northern hemisphere)
 Billia  (2; Mexico to South America)
 Handeliodendron  (1; China)

Sapindoideae

Paullinieae
 Allophylastrum  (1; Brazil, Guyana)
 Allophylus (?; Pantropical)
 Athyana  (1; Peru, Bolivia, Argentina)
 Balsas  (1; Mexico)
 Bridgesia  (1; Chile)
 Cardiospermum  (15; Pantropical)
 Diatenopteryx  (2; Southern South America)
 Lophostigma  (2; Ecuador, Peru, Bolivia)
 Paullinia  (c. 190; Neotropics & Africa)
 Serjania  (c. 230; Neotropics)
 Thinouia  (c. 12; Central and South America)
 Urvillea  (c. 15; Central and South America)

Tribe Incertae sedis

 Talisia  (52; Southern Mexico to South America)
 Alatococcus  (1; Brazil)
 Alectryon  (25; Malesia, Australasia and Micronesia)
 Amesiodendron  (1–3; Southern China to Sumatra)
 Aporrhiza  (4–6; Tropical Africa)
 Arytera (c. 28; India, Southeast Asia to Australasia)
 Atalaya  (12; South Africa, Australia, Malesia)
 Beguea  (1; Madagascar)
 Bizonula  (1; Gabon)
 Blighia  (3; Tropical Africa)
 Blighiopsis  (1; Central Africa)
 Blomia  (1; Mexico, Guatemala and Belize)
 Boniodendron , syn. Sinoradlkofera  (2; China and Vietnam)
 Camptolepis  (4; East Africa, Madagascar)
 Castanospora  (1; Australia)
 Chouxia  (6; Madagascar)
 Chytranthus  (25+; Western tropical Africa)
 Conchopetalum  (2; Madagascar)
 Cnesmocarpon  (1; Australia, Papua New Guinea)
 Cubilia  (1; Malesia)
 Cupania  (c. 50; Neotropical)
 Cupaniopsis  (60; Malesia to Australasia)
 Deinbollia  (c. 38; Southern Africa, Madagascar, Mascarene)
 Delavaya  (1; China)
 Dictyoneura  (2–3; Malesia, Philippines, Australia)
 Dilodendron  (3; Neotropical)
 Dimocarpus  (6; Southern Asia to Australia)
 Diploglottis  (12; Australia, Papua New Guinea)
 Elattostachys  (c. 20; Malesia, Australasia)
 Eriocoelum  (10+; Tropical Africa)
 Erythrophysa  (5; South Africa, Madagascar)
 Gereaua  (1; Madagascar)
 Glenniea  (8; Paleotropical)
 Gloeocarpus  (1; Philippines)
 Gongrodiscus  (3; New Caledonia)
 Gongrospermum  (3; Philippines)
 Guindilia  (3; Southern South America)
 Guioa  (c. 64; Southeastern Asia to Australasia)
 Haplocoelopsis  (1; Central and East Africa)
 Haplocoelum  (c. 7; Tropical Africa and Madagascar)
 Hornea  (1; Mauritius)
 Houssayanthus  (5; Central and Southern America)
 Jagera  (2; Moluccas, New Guinea, Australia)
 Koelreuteria  (c. 4; Eastern Asia)
 Laccodiscus  (c. 6; West Africa)
 Lecaniodiscus  (2; Tropical Africa)
 Lepiderema  (8; Australia, New Guinea)
 Lepidopetalum  (6; Malesia, Australia)
 Lepisanthes  (c. 24; Paleotropics, Australia)
 Litchi   (1; Southeastern China to Malesia)
 Lychnodiscus  (c. 7; Tropical Africa)
 Macphersonia  (8; Aldabra, Madagascar, West Tropical Africa)
 Matayba  (c. 50; Neotropical)
 Melicoccus  (10; Dominican Republic, South America)
 Mischarytera  (3; Australia, Papua New Guinea)
 Mischocarpus ( (c. 15; Southeastern Asia to Australia)
 Molinaea  (c. 10; Madagascar and Mascarenes Islands)
 Neotina 
 Nephelium  (c. 16; Southeastern Asia to Malesia)
 Otonephelium (1; Southern India)
 Pancovia  (10–12; West Africa)
 Pappea  (1; Southern Africa)
 Paranephelium  (4; Yunnan to Malesia)
 Pavieasia  (1–3; China)
 Pentascyphus  (1; French Guiana, Surinam, Brazil)
 Phyllotrichum  (1; Laos)
 Placodiscus  (c. 10; Tropical Africa)
 Plagioscyphus  (c. 10; Madagascar)
 Podonephelium  (4; New Caledonia)
 Pometia  (2; India and Pacific Islands)
 Porocystis  (2; Brazil, French Guiana)
 Pseudima  (1; Continental neotropics)
 Pseudopancovia  (1; West Equatorial Africa)
 Pseudopteris  (3; Madagascar)
 Radlkofera  (1; Western Africa)
 Rhysotoechia  (c. 14; Australia, Malesia)
 Sapindus  (c. 10; Circumtropical)
 Sarcopteryx  (12-13; Australia, Moluccas, New Guinea)
 Sarcotoechia  (c. 11; Australia, Moluccas, New Guinea)
 Schleichera  (1; Sri Lanka and India to Malesia)
 Scyphonychium  (1; Brazil, French Guiana)
 Sisyrolepis  (1; Thailand & Cambodia)
 Smelophyllum  (1; South Africa)
 Stadtmannia  (6; East Tropical Africa, Madagascar, Mauritius)
 Stocksia  (1; Near East, Afghanistan)
 Storthocalyx  (4; New Caledonia)
 Synima  (2; Australia, New Guinea)
 Thouinia  (c. 30; West indies, Central America)
 Thouinidium  (6;| Central America & Greater Antilles)
 Tina <ref name=Schultes1819/ (19; Madagascar)
 Tinopsis 
 Toechima  (c. 8; Australia, New Guinea)
 Toulicia  (12; South America)
 Trigonachras  (8; Non-Javanese Malesia & Lesser Sunda)
 Tripterodendron  (1; Brazil)
 Tristira  (1;| Philippines, Moluccas, Celebes)
 Tristiropsis  (3; Malesia & Australasia)
 Tsingya  (1; Madagascar)
 Ungnadia  (1; Mexico, Texas)
 Vouarana  (2; Costa Rica to Brazil)
 Xerospermum  (2; Bangladesh, Indochina to Eastern Malesia)
 Zollingeria  (3-4; Indochina, Borneo)

Xanthoceratoideae
 Xanthoceras  (1; China)

Notes

References

 
Sapindaceae
Sapindaceae
.